The Commander of the Papua New Guinea Defence Force is the highest-ranking military officer of in the Papua New Guinea Defence Force, who is responsible for maintaining the operational command of the military. The current commander is Brigadier general Gilbert Toropo.

List of Commanders

See also
Papua New Guinea Defence Force

References

Military of Papua New Guinea
Papua New Guinea